That's the Way of the World: Alive in '75 is a live album by American band Earth, Wind & Fire  issued in April 2002 on Columbia/Legacy records.

Critical reception

Mark Anthony Neal of Popmatters called the album "a worthwhile investment." Stephen Thomas Erlewine of Allmusic also described That's the Way of the World: Alive in '75 as "a fun record" that's "burning bright consistently throughout."

Track listing

References

Albums produced by Maurice White
Earth, Wind & Fire live albums
2002 live albums
Columbia Records live albums